Sarcodon thwaitesii is a species of tooth fungus in the family Bankeraceae. It is found in Asia, Europe, and New Zealand, where it fruits on the ground in mixed forest.

Taxonomy
The fungus was first described in 1873 by Miles Berkeley and Christopher Edmund Broome as Hydnum thwaitesii, from collections made in Sri Lanka. Paul Christoph Hennings moved it to the now-defunct genus Phaeodon in 1898. Dutch mycologist Rudolph Arnold Maas Geesteranus transferred it to the genus Sarcodon in 1964, noting "To judge from the hyphal structure and the spore characters, this is a true Sarcodon". Gordon Herriot Cunningham's species Hydnum carbonarium, described from New Zealand in 1958, is a synonym of S. thwaitesii.

The specific epithet thwaitesii honors English botanist and entomologist George Henry Kendrick Thwaites, who was superintendent of the botanical gardens at Peradeniya, Sri Lanka.

Maas Geesteranus placed S. thwaitesii in the section Virescentes, along with S. atroviridis and S. conchyliatus. In all of these species, the flesh dries to a deep olive green color.

Description
Initially pale pink in color, they change to pale reddish-brown, and ultimately to blackish-brown. The flesh, roughly the same color as the cap, has a bitter taste. The spines on the cap underside are at first purple or purple brown, drying to blackish brown in age, and measure 2–4 mm. Spores are brown in mass; microscopically, they are roughly spherical, covered with moderate sized growths (tubercules), and measure 6–8 by 6–7 µm.

Habitat and distribution
Sarcodon thwaitesii fruits on the ground in mixed forest. It is found in Asia, Europe, and New Zealand.

References

External links

Fungi described in 1873
Fungi of Asia
Fungi of Europe
Fungi of New Zealand
thwaitesii
Taxa named by Miles Joseph Berkeley
Taxa named by Christopher Edmund Broome